The MPA Program at University of North Carolina at Chapel Hill is a full-time, two-year curriculum that serves up to 60 students annually. Courses range from management, leadership, public policy analysis, to project evaluation, the program educates future leaders for local, state, and federal governments and nonprofit organizations.

Established in 1966 at UNC, the MPA Program became an integral part of the School of Government in 1997. As the largest university-based local government training, advisory, and research organization in the United States, the School of Government offers up to 200 classes, seminars, schools, and specialized conferences for more than 12,000 public officials each year. In addition, faculty members annually publish approximately 50 books, periodicals, and other reference works related to state and local government. Each day that the General Assembly is in session, the school produces the "Daily Bulletin," which reports on the day's activities for members of the legislature and others who need to follow the course of legislation.

Ranking
The program is considered among the best public administration graduate programs in the country, ranking second nationally in the specialty area of local government, and 21st overall.

Academics
The curriculum is designed to be completed in two years of study. Students complete a management internship between their first and second years. Additionally, the program requires that each student, advised by a faculty committee, complete an independent capstone research project, reported in writing and orally to an audience of public service professionals. A more flexible schedule is available for a limited number of experienced practitioners.

UNC-Chapel Hill also offers dual degree programs with the UNC School of Law, School of Social Work, and Information and Library Science; the Departments of City and Regional Planning, Public Policy, and the Nonprofit Leadership Certificate Program.

Faculty
School of Government faculty members who teach in the MPA Program also are engaged in School of Government programs serving state agencies and local governments. These professors are joined on the MPA teaching faculty by other faculty members based outside the School of Government.

MPA@UNC: Online MPA Program
Carolina's MPA program is also offered in an online format MPA@UNC.

The MPA@UNC program is designed with working professionals in mind, offering the accessibility and flexibility of online education with the best of UNC's on-campus experience, including a virtual classroom setting, to effectively teach tomorrow's public service leaders.

The program employs the same rigorous curriculum and courses as the on-campus program, and students are held to the same academic standards. Students attend live, face-to-face online classes led by UNC School of Government faculty. The program also includes self-paced coursework and hands-on learning through a professional experience component, which is designed to empower students with the knowledge and relationships needed to progress in their career. Upon completion of the program, students will have developed and practiced the skills necessary to be a public leader with the core knowledge, perspectives, and relationships necessary to manage local, state, and federal agencies, as well as nonprofit organizations. The knowledge and skills gained from the program can be applied in any organization, city, state, or country.

MPA@UNC's first cohort started classes in January 2013.

Alumni
Graduates of Carolina's MPA program enjoy successful careers in every level of government and in organizations that support the public interest, including nonprofits and a range of businesses in the private sector. Alumni include those currently in the following positions:

US Government
Assistant US Attorney
Mayor
Budget Analyst, US Senate
State Government
Human Resources Director, Office of the Governor
Deputy State Treasurer
Municipal Government
City/Town Manager
Assistant City/Town Manager
Director of Mobility & Transportation
Nonprofit Organizations
VP of Operations, American Museum of Natural History
Regional Director, Environmental Defense Fund
Academic Institutions
VP of Business & Finance (College)
VP for Government Relation (University)

References

External links
 http://www.sog.unc.edu/uncmpa
 http://onlinempa.unc.edu/

Master of Public Administration